Phyllus or Phylos was a city near Mount Phylleium in the district of Thessaliotis, in ancient Thessaly. Strabo says the city was noted for a temple of Apollo Phylleius. Statius calls this city Phylli. The city is also cited by Stephanus of Byzantium.

The site of Phyllus is at Magoula Paliambela, a large tell in the modern municipal unit of Fyllo.

References

Former populated places in Greece
Populated places in ancient Thessaly
Thessaliotis